Pieter "Piet" van der Kruk (13 August 1941 – 4 June 2020) was a Dutch heavyweight weightlifter and shot putter. He won five national weightlifting titles (1964, 1965, 1967–1969) and four shot put titles (1964, 1965, 1967 and 1969), and held the national shot put record from 1967 to 1976. He qualified for the 1968 Summer Olympics both as a shot putter and weightlifter; he chose to compete in weightlifting only and finished in ninth place.

After retiring from competitions van der Kruk worked as a national weightlifting coach. From 1988 to 1998 he was a member of the Dutch Olympic Committee, and between 1998 and 2002 headed the Dutch antidoping organization NeCeDo (Nederlands Centrum voor Dopingvraagstukken) in Rotterdam. Later he worked as TV sports commentator with Eurosport.

References

1941 births
2020 deaths
Dutch male shot putters
Dutch male weightlifters
Dutch sports executives and administrators
Dutch sports journalists
Olympic weightlifters of the Netherlands
Sports commentators
Sportspeople from Delft
Weightlifters at the 1968 Summer Olympics